The Agate Pass Bridge is a structural steel truss cantilever bridge spanning Agate Pass, connecting Bainbridge Island to the Kitsap Peninsula.  It was built in 1950, and it replaced a car ferry service which dated from the 1920s. The bridge provides a direct route along Washington State Route 305 between Seattle, via the Seattle-Bainbridge Island ferry, and the Kitsap Peninsula.

The original construction cost of $1,351,363 was paid out of the motor vehicle fund, and operated as a toll bridge from October 7, 1950, until October 1, 1951, when costs were repaid by a bond issue passed by the Washington State Legislature.  The Washington Toll Bridge Authority managed the bridge during the year it took to repay the bond.

The Agate Pass Bridge is listed on the National Register of Historic Places.

References

Bridges completed in 1950
Bainbridge Island, Washington
Transportation buildings and structures in Kitsap County, Washington
Road bridges on the National Register of Historic Places in Washington (state)
Former toll bridges in Washington (state)
National Register of Historic Places in Kitsap County, Washington
Steel bridges in the United States
Cantilever bridges in the United States
1950 establishments in Washington (state)